Teo is a municipality in the Spanish province of A Coruña in the autonomous community of Galicia in northwestern Spain. It has a population of 18,266 (Spanish 2011 Census) and an area of 79 km².

Municipalities in the Province of A Coruña